Hauben is a surname. Notable people with the surname include:

Daniel Hauben (born 1956), American painter
Lawrence Hauben (1931–1985), American actor and screenwriter
Léopold Hauben (1912-?), Belgian fencer
Michael Hauben (1973–2001), American internet theorist and author